Malicious may refer to:

Films and video games
 Malicious (1973 film) (Malizia), an Italian comedy starring Laura Antonelli
 Malicious (1995 film), an American thriller starring Molly Ringwald
 Malicious (2018 film), an American horror film starring Delroy Lindo
 Malicious (video game), a 2010 download-only 3D action game

Thoroughbred race horses
 Malicious (horse), foaled 1927
 Malicious, winner of the 1964 Jim Dandy Stakes 
 Malicious III, winner of the 1965 Evening Attire Stakes

See also 
 
 Malice (legal term)
 Malice (disambiguation)
 Malware